John Husband (28 May 1918 – 29 April 1992) was a Scottish professional football player and manager. Husband spent the majority of his club career at Partick Thistle, where he made almost 400 appearances in all competitions, and was also capped twice by Scotland. Husband also spent a short time as manager of Queen of the South.

Playing career

Partick Thistle
Husband signed for Partick Thistle in 1938 and, apart from a brief spell as manager of Queen of the South, spent the rest of his adult life there. He was a centre back and is generally considered as one of Thistle's greatest ever players. He amassed 371 appearances and scored 12 goals during his playing career with Thistle either side of World War II (the vast majority coming in the unofficial competitions during the conflict – as a farm-worker, he was exempt from military service). He was noted for his ability to throw the ball forty yards at throw-ins.

Husband spent 52 years at Partick Thistle, first as reserve player and progressing through roles as player, captain, trainer, coach, physiotherapist and kitman and was a regular at the club until days before his death in 1992. His greatest triumph at Thistle came in 1945 where he captained the team to a win over Hibernian to win the wartime Summer Cup (the competition that replaced the Scottish Cup during the war). The stand opposite the main stand at Thistle's Firhill Stadium is named the Jackie Husband Stand.

International
Husband collected two caps for Scotland in 1946 against Switzerland (a Victory International considered official by the respective national associations) and Wales (in the 1946–47 British Home Championship), but also played in another Victory International (not considered official), and in an additional fundraising match for the bereaved and survivors of the Burnden Park Disaster, both in that same year and with England the opponents. He also represented the Scottish League once in 1947.

Managerial career
Husband managed Dumfries club Queen of the South in 1967–68. In his time at Palmerston Park he worked with players such as Allan Ball, Iain McChesney, Jim Kerr, Lex Law and Billy Collings.

References

1918 births
1992 deaths
Footballers from Dunfermline
Association football central defenders
Scottish footballers
Scottish football managers
Scotland international footballers
Scottish Football League players
Partick Thistle F.C. players
Queen of the South F.C. managers
Scottish Football League representative players
Yoker Athletic F.C. players
Scottish Football League managers
Scotland wartime international footballers
Date of death missing
Scottish Junior Football Association players
Partick Thistle F.C. non-playing staff
Footballers from Renfrewshire